Harichand Megha Dalaya (22 October 1921 – 14 September 2004) was the inventor of the first spray-dryer for buffalo milk in the world. His invention revolutionized India's dairy farming industry (Operation Flood) and laid the foundation for Amul cooperative's immense success.

Early life and education 
H. M. Dalaya was born on 22 October 1921 in Karachi in Colonial India. His parents originated from Mathura and were successful dairy farmers.

In 1944, he graduated from the Pune Agriculture Engineering College, Pune. In 1948, he acquired a master's degree in Dairy Technology from Michigan State University, Michigan. In 1950 he completed the Advanced Business Management Program from the Harvard Business School in Boston.

After his studies, H. M. Dalaya returned to a newly independent India. The partition had caused the loss of his family's land in Karachi, which was now part of Pakistan. Discouraged and with little hope for the future, he contemplated returning to the United States to begin afresh.

Turning point 
His friend Verghese Kurien, convinced him to visit Amul "for a week or so, to see how he liked it". Amul became his life's calling and H. M. Dalaya stayed on until his retirement.

Buffalo milk was abundant in the Kheda district but the possibility of transporting it to bigger markets was limited due to technological constraints. To expand, the Kaira Co-operative Milk Producers Union (Amul) had to envision converting this surplus milk into powder. In its powdered form, the milk could be transported over longer distances to bigger markets and milk deprived regions

At the time however, the technology of spray-drying buffalo milk did not yet exist. Only cow's milk was being converted. The collective consensus of dairy experts worldwide was that buffalo milk could not be spray-dried due to its high fat content. H. M. Dalaya believed otherwise and was determined to prove so.

Technological breakthrough 
In 1955, his keen technological knowledge and engineering capabilities resulted in the installation of the patented Spray Dry Equipment, the world's first buffalo milk spray-dryer, at Amul Dairy in Gujrat.

H. M. Dalaya was the silent force behind the success of Amul. While Tribhuvandas Kishibai Patel is regarded as its "father" and Verghese Kurien as its "son", H. M. Dalaya is considered its "holy ghost" whose contribution changed the future of Indian dairy farming.

References 

1921 births
2004 deaths
20th-century Indian businesspeople
20th-century Indian engineers
Indian cooperative organizers
Cooperatives in India
People from Anand district
Engineers from Karachi
Indian mechanical engineers
Indian social entrepreneurs
Michigan State University alumni
History of agriculture in India
Dairy farming in India
Indian expatriates in the United States